Valley View is the name of some places in the U.S. state of Pennsylvania:

Valley View, Schuylkill County, Pennsylvania
Valley View, York County, Pennsylvania